is a Japanese female tarento, actress, and former gravure idol.

She used to be represented by the talent agency, Artist-house Pyramid, but after working as a freelancer, she currently is represented by Central.

Biography
She graduated from the Hinode Girls High School.

In 2000, when she was a junior high school student, she debuted in the entertainment industry as a junior idol by belonging to Five Eight under her real name .

In 2008, she re-debuted with her stage name Natsuki Ikeda and moved to Artist-house Pyramid. Since then, she has been active mainly in magazine gravure and variety shows.

According to her blog on 2 December 2015, she left Artist-house Pyramid in the summer of the same year, and revealed that she became a freelancer after that.

Later on, she reported in a 2017 blog post that she became affiliated with Central, graduated from gravure idol activities, and turned into an actress.

Personal life
Her hobby is playing with her dog. Her special skill is swimming.
She has an elder sister who is three years older.
She has a best friend from her high school days.

Filmography

Main TV programmes

School festivals

Stage

Films

Direct-to-video

Works

DVD
 As Miki Omori

 As Natsuki Ikeda

Digital photos+movie work collections

Bibliography

Photo albums

References

Notes

Sources

External links
 – Ameba Blog 
 – Wayback Machine (archived on 14 Jan 2015) 

Japanese television personalities
Japanese gravure idols
Actors from Chiba Prefecture
1987 births
Living people
Models from Chiba Prefecture